= Hip Chick Farms =

Poultry company in Sonoma County, California

- Industry: Frozen Food
- Founded: 2011; 15 years ago in Sebastopol, California, United States
- Founders: Jennifer Johnson and Serafina Palandech
- Products: Frozen Poultry

Hip Chick Farms is a poultry company in Sonoma County, California that produces products made from chickens that it says are humanely raised. The company makes frozen chicken dinner items including spicy wings, chicken meatballs and nuggets.

Founded in 2011, Hip Chick Farms received some help from the Sonoma County Loan Fund to kick start the company, and again in 2014 to print new packaging with an additional loan from Whole foods for the rebranding. The revamp of the packaging from plastic tubs to boxes led to a 500% increase in sales.

Hip Chick Farms was in 300 stores in 2015.

The founders sold their interest in the company in 2018 and moved to Oregon.
